The following is a list of Belgian magazines which are published in French, in Dutch and in other languages.

0
 24h01

A

 A Prior Magazine 
 À Suivre
  L’art libre
 L'Art Moderne

B

 Belgian Boutique 
 Boer en Tuinder 
 The Bulletin
 The Brussels Times

C

 Ciné Télé Revue
 Le Congo illustré
 The Courier (ACP-EU)

Ç

 Ça Ira

D

 Dag Allemaal
 De Bond 
 Durendal
 DW B

E

 E!Sharp

F

 Femmes d’Aujourd’hui
 Fire
 Flair
 Flore des Serres et des Jardins de l'Europe

G

 Gael
 Green European Journal
 Gonzo
 Le Guide musical

H

 Het Overzicht
 Het Rijk der Vrouw
 HUMO

I
 L'Illustration Européenne

J

 La Jeune Belgique
 Joepie

K

 Kerk en Leven 
 Knack

L

 La Lettre b
 Libelle
 Lumière

M

 Le Magasin littéraire et scientifique
 Mondiaal Nieuws
 Médor
 Le Moniteur Belge
 More
 Moustique
 Le Mouvement Géographique (1884–1922)

N

 Nest
 Nieuwsblad

O

 Ons Volkske

P

 P-Magazine
 The Parliament Magazine
 Le Petit Vingtième
 Plus Magazine
 Pourquoi pas ?
 Processing and Control News Europe

R

 Recherches husserliennes
 Rekto:verso
Revue catholique des idées et des faits

S

 Secret
 Snoecks
 Le Soir 
 Spirou
 Story
 Suske en Wiske Weekblad

T

 't Pallieterke
 Technische Revue
 TeKoS
 Ter Zake
 Le Timbre-Poste
 Tintin
 Together
 Touring
 Trends

V

 Van Nu en Straks
 Victoire
 Le Vif/L’Express
 Vitaya
 Vlaanderen

W

 Wonder en is gheen Wonder
 World Aviation

Z

 Zeste
 Zondag Nieuws
 Zonneland
 ZozoLala

References

Belgium
Magazines